Choi Ju-yong (born November 8, 1996) is a South Korean football player. He plays for Suwon Samsung Bluewings.

Playing career
Choi Ju-yong played for J3 League club; Renofa Yamaguchi FC in 2015 season. He moved to Suwon Samsung Bluewings in 2016.

References

External links

1996 births
Living people
South Korean footballers
J3 League players
Renofa Yamaguchi FC players
Association football midfielders